Dilipbhai Shivshankerbhai Pandya (born 30 January 1944 Panchgani, Satat district, MH ) is an Indian politician of the Bharatiya Janata Party. Since April 2011, he is the member of the Parliament of India representing Gujarat State in the Rajya Sabha, the upper house.

References

Living people
1944 births
Bharatiya Janata Party politicians from Gujarat
Rajya Sabha members from Gujarat
People from Satara district
People from Patan district